A Nomarski prism is a modification of the Wollaston prism that is used in differential interference contrast microscopy. It is named after its inventor, Polish and naturalized-French physicist Georges Nomarski. Like the Wollaston prism, the Nomarski prism consists of two birefringent crystal wedges (e.g. quartz or calcite) cemented together at the hypotenuse (e.g. with Canada balsam). One of the wedges is identical to a conventional Wollaston wedge and has the optical axis oriented parallel to the surface of the prism. The second wedge of the prism is modified by cutting the crystal so that the optical axis is oriented obliquely with respect to the flat surface of the prism. The Nomarski modification causes the light rays to come to a focal point outside the body of the prism, and allows greater flexibility so that when setting up the microscope the prism can be actively focused.

See also
Glan–Foucault prism
Glan–Thompson prism
Nicol prism
Prism (optics)
Rochon prism
Sénarmont prism

References

External links
Nomarski Prism Action in Polarized Light
Wavefront Shear in Wollaston and Nomarski Prisms

Polarization (waves)
Prisms (optics)
Microscopy